Khazar Baku FK is an Azerbaijani football club based in Khazar raion, Baku.

History 
The club was founded in 2017 and participates in the Azerbaijan First Division.

Colours
The colours of the club are white and blue.

Current squad

Managers
 Rovshan Gasimov (2017)
 Elshad Ahmadov (2018)

Honours
Azerbaijan First Division
 Winners (1): 2017–18

References

External links 
 PFL

Football clubs in Azerbaijan
Association football clubs established in 2017
2017 establishments in Azerbaijan
Defunct football clubs in Azerbaijan
Association football clubs disestablished in 2018
2018 disestablishments in Azerbaijan